Political risk insurance is a type of insurance that can be taken out by businesses, of any size, against political risk—the risk that revolution or other political conditions will result in a loss.

Political risk insurance is available for several different types of political risk, including:
 Political violence, such as revolution, insurrection, civil unrest, terrorism or war;
 Governmental expropriation or confiscation of assets;
 Governmental frustration or repudiation of contracts;
 Wrongful calling of letters of credit or similar on-demand guarantees; 
 Business Interruption; and
 Inconvertibility of foreign currency or the inability to repatriate funds.
As with any insurance, the precise scope of coverage is governed by the terms of the insurance policy.

The underwriting of political risk insurance is a dynamic, growing business. As globalisation increases, there are more corporations doing more business in more places around the world with each passing year. Some of the changes occurring in the business are high growth, new product offerings, and a greater role for private capital.

While political risk insurance policies are sometimes manuscripted for specific situations, the major political risk insurers have standard forms for the coverages that they issue.  For "complex" or larger investments manuscripted policies are the norm and there may be several insurers providing cover in the form of a syndication, through co-insurance, or perhaps with the participation of a reinsurer on a facultative basis. 

Providers of political risk insurance include public agencies and private insurance companies.

References

External links 
The Islamic Corporation for the Insurance of Investment and Export Credit
Multilateral Investment Guarantee Agency
Investment Guarantees of the Federal Republic of Germany

Overseas Private Investment Corporation

Types of insurance